Elections to Nuneaton and Bedworth Borough Council were held on 1 May 2008. Half of the council was up for election and the Conservative Party gained control of the council from Labour.
This was the first time that the British National Party had fielded candidates in the Borough for election to the Borough Council.

After the election, the composition of the council was

 Conservative 18
 Labour 14
 British National Party 2

Election results

Ward results

2008
2008 English local elections
2000s in Warwickshire